Volker Kellermann (1915 – 2000) was a German philologist who specialized in Germanic studies. His best known work is Germanische Altertumskunde: Einführung in Das Studium Einer Kulturgeschichte Der Vor-und Früzeit (1966), which provides as survey of the study of Germanic Antiquity.

Selected works
 Bestattungsbrauch und Totenglaube der frühen Ostgermanen, 1938
 Germanische Gegenstandskultur, 1955
 Germanische Altertumskunde, 1966

See also
 Jan de Vries (philologist)
 Edgar C. Polomé

Sources

 
 
 
 

1915 births
2000 deaths
German scholars
Germanic studies scholars